Yohan Camilo Chaverra Córdoba (born 21 March 1995, in Turbo) is a Colombian hurdler.

He is also a high jumper. He established his personal best on 110 m hs to 13.46 in Cali, in June 2019. He qualified for the semifinals at the 2019 World Athletics Championships in Doha.

References

External links
IAAF Profile

Living people
1995 births
Colombian male hurdlers
Sportspeople from Antioquia Department
Colombian male high jumpers
21st-century Colombian people